Bruno Méndez may refer to:

Bruno Méndez (footballer) (born 1999), Uruguayan footballer
Bruno Méndez (racing driver) (born 1990), Spanish racing driver